Gliese 877 (GJ 877 / HIP 113229 / LHS 531) is a red dwarf located in the southern constellation of Octans, near the boundary with Indus.

Gliese 877's bolometric luminosity is just 2.3% of the Sun's. It shines with an apparent magnitude of +10.22, so it cannot be seen with the naked eye. Nevertheless, it is considerably brighter than other red dwarfs, such as Proxima Centauri, the closest red dwarf to the Solar System; in particular, it is almost 14 times more luminous than Proxima. Of spectral type M3V, its effective temperature is 3390 K. It does not appear to be a variable star.

Gliese 877 is 28.1 light years from the Solar System. Known stars close to it are β Hydri and ζ Tucanae, respectively 4.5 and 6.2 light years.

See also 
 List of star systems within 25–30 light-years

References 

0877
113229
Octans
M-type main-sequence stars